Kenz-Küstrow is a municipality in the Vorpommern-Rügen district, in Mecklenburg-Vorpommern, Germany.

During the Middle Ages, Kenz was an important destination of pilgrimages. Barnim VI is buried in Kenz.

References

Burial sites of the House of Pomerania